This is a list of villages in Aurangabad district, Bihar.

 Abdulpur
 Achuki
 Adhaura
 Adhyan Khap
 Adma
 Adma Rastipur
 Adri
 Agini
 Ahamadpur
 Ahirari
 Ahiyapur
 Ajania
 Ajho
 Ekauna
 Akauni
 Akoni
 Ankorha
 Akorhi
 Alampur
 Alarpur
 Alpa
 Amarpur
 Amarpura
 Amauna (Barun), Aurangabad
 Amauna (Nabinagar), Aurangabad
 Amba
 Amdiha
 Amilauna
 Amjhar
 Anandpura
 Anchha, Pauthu
 Andari
 Anehha
 Angrahi
 Anjania
 Anjanian
 Ankorha
 Ankupa
 Ankuri
 Anwari
 Apki
 Arai
 Arai Khap
 Aran gar
 Aranda
 Arjun Bigha
 Arri
 Arthua
 Arti
 Asapur
 Asia
 Asias
 Askhap
 At
 Atrauli
 Atraulibanwari
 Atraulidhan
 Aurangaba d
 Aurangabad (M)
 Aurangabad (M) - Ward No.1
 Aurangabad (M) - Ward No.10
 Aurangabad (M) - Ward No.11
 Aurangabad (M) - Ward No.12
 Aurangabad (M) - Ward No.13
 Aurangabad (M) - Ward No.14
 Aurangabad (M) - Ward No.15
 Aurangabad (M) - Ward No.2
 Aurangabad (M) - Ward No.3
 Aurangabad (M) - Ward No.4
 Aurangabad (M) - Ward No.5
 Aurangabad (M) - Ward No.6
 Aurangabad (M) - Ward No.7
 Aurangabad (M) - Ward No.8
 Aurangabad (M) - Ward No.9
 Aurawan
 Az Rakbe Sohraiya
 Azan
 Babhandih
 Babhandiha
 Badarpur
 Baddopur
 Badli
 Bagaha
 Bagahi
 Bagaiya
 Bagha Soti
 Baghakol
 Bagharewa
 Baghaura
 Baghi
 Baghoi
 Baghoi Kalan
 Baghoi Khurd
 Baghtarpa
 Bagnaha
 Bahadurpur
 Bahera
 Bahlola
 Bahuara
 Bahuti
 Baidahi
 Baijal
 Baijalpur
 Bairawan
 Bairawan Loknath
 Bairia
 Bajraun
 Bakan
 Bakhari
 Bakhtiarpur
 Bakhtiyarpur
 Baksanr
 Baktua
 Bala Bigha
 Balar
 Balia
 Baligawan
 Balihari
 Balkarna
 Balli Bigaha
 Balmha
 Baluganj Barandi
 Bamahi
 Banahi
 Banahra
 Banatra Said
 Banauli
 Banchar Bagra
 Banchar Khurd
 Bandea
 Bandhua
 Bandra
 Banhara
 Bania
 Banian
 Banka
 Bankat
 Banokhar
 Banra
 Bansikhap
 Banua
 Bar Pisani
 Bara
 Bara Khurd
 Barahi
 Barahra
 Barai Khap
 Baranda Rampur
 Barauli
 Barawan
 Bardih Kalan
 Bardih Khurd
 Bardiha
 Barem
 Bargawan
 Barhar
 Barheta
 Barianwan
 Bariawan
 Barimal
 Bariyawan
 Barki Parhi
 Barki Regania
 Barman
 Barokhar
 Barpa
 Barun
 Baruna
 Barwan
 Basant
 Basar Bigha
 Basat pur
 Basatpur
 Basaura
 Basawanpur
 Basdiha
 Basdiha Gopal
 Basdiha Khurd
 Basdihakalan
 Basri
 Bataspur
 Batawan
 Batura
 Baturi
 Baunr
 Bazidpur
 Bazidpur Khurd
 Bedauli
 Bedaulia
 Bedauliya
 Bel
 Bela
 Belain
 Beladhi
 Belarhia
 Belaru
 Belaspur
 Belauti
 Beli
 Belsara
 Belwa
 Bengahi
 Beni
 Beni Ganjhar
 Berewa
 Berhani
 Berhna
 Beri
 Berka
 Betula
 Bhadokhar
 Bhadua
 Bhaduki
 Bhaduki Kalan
 Bhadwa
 Bhagli
 Bhagwanpur, Aurangabad
 Bhairopur
 Bhakharua
 Bhakhra
 Bhalu Khaira
 Bhalua
 Bhalua Chak
 Bhaluahi
 Bhaluhar
 Bhaluhara
 Bhaluwari
 Bhaluwari Kalan
 Bhaluwari Khurd
 Bhandari
 Bharath
 Bharaundha
 Bharaundhi
 Bharkur
 Bharthauli
 Bharthipur
 Bharub
 Bharwar
 Bhasgarh
 Bhatanri
 Bhattbigha
 Bhataulia
 Bhatkur
 Bhatkurha
 Bhatwa Bhagli
 Bhauli
 Bhauthahi
 Bhawanipur
 Bhed
 Bhelwa
 Bhelwandi
 Bheria
 Bheriya
Bheriya bigha 824143
 Bhetaniyan
 Bhewanri
 Bhikhanpura
 Bhimlichak
 Bhuapur
 Bhuia
 Bhukhan Tendua
 Bhupatpur
 Bhurkunda
 Bhurkurya
 Bibipur
Biraj Bigha
 Bichkurwa
 Bihta
 Bijauli
 Bijoi
 Bijulia
 Binuliya
 Birahra
 Birai Nawadih
 Birua
 Bisambharpur
 Biseni
 Bishunipur
 Bishunpur
 Bishunpura
 Bisrampur
 Budhai Khurd
 Budhaikalan
 Budhaul
 Budhua
 Bumru
 Bwlwa
 Chahunta
 Chainpur
 Chakua (Parmar garh)
 Chamanpur
 Chamardiha
 Chamotha
 Chand Bigha
 Chand Khap
 Chanda
 Chandan Bigha
 Chandar Garh
 Chandauli
 Chandaut
 Chandi
 Chandli
 Chandokhar
 Chandpur
 Chandpur Bhataulia
 Chandrapura
 Chandri
 Chanduli Buzurg
 Chanhat
 Chankap
 Chanrrahi
 Chantar
 Chapra
 Chapri
 Chapuk
 Charan Kalan
 Charkanwan Qasba Haji
 Charkupa
 Chatar
 Chatar Khas
 Chatara
 Chatra
 Chaubara
 Chaukhara
 Chaukna
 Chaunri
 Chaurahi
 Chauram
 Chauria
 Chauriya
 Checharhi
 Chein Nawada
 Chein Tola Udam Bigha
 Chenwan
 Chetan
 Chetu Bigaha
 Chhalidohar
 Chhotki Parhi
 Chhuchhia
 Chichmhi
 Chilhiawan
 Chilki
 Chiraila
 Chiraili
 Chitargopi
 Chitrsari
 Chitwar Khap
 Choraha
 Chura Parsurampur
 Dabura
 Dabura Kalan
 Dabura Khurd
 Dadar
 Dadhpa
 Dadhpi
 Dambha
 Damodarpur
 Danai
 Dangra
 Danrwa
 Darar
 Darbhanga
 Darha
 Dariapur
 Dariyabad
 Dariyapur
 Darmi
 Darmi Kalan
 Darmi Khurd
 Darmian
 Darua
 Dasaunti
 Daswat Bigha
 Daswat Khap
 Daudnagar
 Daudnagar (M)
 Daudnagar (M) - Ward No.1
 Daudnagar (M) - Ward No.10
 Daudnagar (M) - Ward No.11
 Daudnagar (M) - Ward No.12
 Daudnagar (M) - Ward No.13
 Daudnagar (M) - Ward No.2
 Daudnagar (M) - Ward No.3
 Daudnagar (M) - Ward No.4
 Daudnagar (M) - Ward No.5
 Daudnagar (M) - Ward No.6
 Daudnagar (M) - Ward No.7
 Daudnagar (M) - Ward No.8
 Daudnagar (M) - Ward No.9
 Daudpur
 Daulalpur Nagauli
 Daulatpur
 Debikanri
 Dehri
 Dehuli
 Dekuli
 Deo
 Deochand
 Deodattpur
 Deoguna
 Deohara
 Deokali
 Deokuli
 Deoriya
 Despur
 Deunria
 Deura
 Deurhi
 Deuria
 Deuria Rustam
 Dewajara
 Dewakund
 Dewakund Arazi
 Dewankhiri
 Dewariya
 Dhamni
 Dhanari
 Dhanauti
 Dhanawan
 Dhandhwa
 Dhangain
 Dhanhara
 Dhanibar
 Dhanjaia
 Dhanu Bigha
 Dharamkhap
 Dharampur
 Dharampura
 Dharhara
 Dhawa
 Dhawahi
 Dhebla Dhebli
 Dhewahi
 Dhibar
 Dhibra
 Dhobaul
 Dhobdiha
 Dhol
 Dholikhap
 Dhondhi
 Dhongra
 Dhosila
 Dhundhua
 Dhunrhua
 Dhuranda
 Dhuriya
 Dhusri
 Dialpur
 Dighi
 Dihra
 Dihri
 Dihuri
 Dihwa
 Dindir
 Dingraha
 Dondi Bigha
 Dosmha
 Dowal
 Duari
 Dudhaila
 Dudhar
 Dudhmi
 Dudhpa
 Dugul
 Dular Bigaha
 Dularchak
 Dulare
 Dumarthu
 Dumra
 Dumri
 Dura
 Durgi
 Ehiapur
 Ekauna
 Ekauni
 Ekdara
 Ekghara
 Enrari
 Eraura
 Erka
 Erki
 Fateha
 Fatehpur
 Gahna
 Gaini
 Gaiwal Bigaha
 Gajna
 Gajoi
 Gamhari
 Gamharia
 Gamhariya
 Gandhara
 Gandharp
 Gangahar
 Gangati
 Gangti
 Gangtua
 Ganj
 Ganu
 Gardi
 Garwa
 Gashari
 Gauharpur
 Gaura
 Gaura Sonbarsa
 Gauri
 Gerua
 Gewal Bigha
 Ghanta
 Ghanto
 Ghataro
 Ghatrain
 Ghauspur
 Ghazikarma
 Ghejna
 Ghetra
 Gheura
 Ghirsindi
 Ghoghra
 Ghonta
 Ghora Dihri
 Ghoraha
 Ghordaur
 Ghorhat
 Ghosta
 Ghughi
 Ghuja
 Ghura Purandar
 Ghura Sagar
 Ghuranand
 Ghutia
 Gijna
 Gira
 Gobardhanpur Kanap
 Gobindpura
 Gogo
 Goh
 Golaha
 Gomdahi
 Gongara
 Gopalpur
 Gorari
 Gordiha
 Gorkatti
 Gortara
 Gosaindih
 Gosaldih
 Gosia
 Gothani
 Gothauli
 Guman
 Gurgaia
 Habaspur
 Habbuchak
 Haibaspur
 Haidar Chak
 Hakaspur Tika
 Hamidnagar
 Hanea
 Hanspura
 Harbansa
 Harchanpur
 Hardaspur
 Hardutta
 Hargawan
 Haria
 Harihar Urdana
 Hariharpur
 Harna
 Harnahi
 Hasampur
 Hasanpur
 Hasanpur Inglish
 Hasanpura
 Hasanur
 Hasauli
 Hasauli Azarkbe
 Haspura
 Hathbor
 Hathikhap
 Hathiyara
 Hazari
 Hemza
 Hetampur
 Hira Saray
 Holichak
 Hunrarha
 Hunrrahi
 Ibrahimpur
 Imanpur
 Indrarh
 Inglis
 Inglish
 Inguna
 Ingunahi
 Inguni
 Iriyap
 Irkikalan
 Isapur
 Itahat
 Itarh
 Itawa
 Itawan
 Itkohi
 Itkohwa
 Itwa
 Jagai Bairahi
 Jagatpur
 Jagaya
 Jagdishpur
 Jagdispur
 Jaipal Bigaha (chauhan garh)
 Jaipur
 Jaipur Belai
 Jaisri Bigha
 Jaitea
 Jaitpur
 Jajapur
 Jakhaura
 Jakhim
 Jalalpur
 Jalpura
 Jalwand
 Jamalpur
 Jamhariya
 Jamhaur (NA)
 Jamhaur (NA) - Ward No.1
 Jamhaur (NA) - Ward No.2
 Jamhaur (NA) - Ward No.3
 Jamhaur (NA) - Ward No.4
 Jamua
 Jamuain
 Jamuawan
 Jamugain
 Jamuhara
 Jamuni
 Jankop
 Jarma Khap
 Jarmakhap
 Jasoia
 Jhakhri
 Jharaha
 Jharhi dhanawan
 Jhari
 Jharna
 Jhikatia
 Jhikatiya
 Jhinguri
 Jhuklahi
 Jhumai
 Jinoriya
 Jogiya
 Jogri
 Jokahri
 Jondhi
 Jora
 Jujharpur
 Kachanpur
 Kadiahi
 Kadiahi Kalan
 Kadiahi Khurd
 Kadirpura
 Kado Khari
 Kadokhari
 Kaithi
 Kaithi Bankat
 Kaithi Beni
 Kaithisiro
 Kajhpa
 Kajhwan
 Kajpa
 Kajrain
 Kakan
 Kala Pahar
 Kalan Dhanawan
 Kalen
 Kalyanpur
 Kamalpur
 Kamath
 Kamdarpur
 Kana Khap
 Kanauda
 Kanbehri
 Kanchan
 Kanker
 Kanokhar
 Kanri
 Kans
 Kantari
 Kapasia
 Kara
 Karahra
 Karam Hazari
 Karamdih
 Karanja
 Karea
 Karhari
 Kariawan
 Karjara
 Karkatta
 Karma
 Karma Bala
 Karma Husen
 Karma masud
 Karma Misir
 Karma Moglani
 Karmadal
 Karman
 Karman Basantpur
 Karman Bechen
 Karman Fatehpur
 Karman Jagarnathpur
 Karman Lahang
 Karmari
 Karmi
 Karmukhap
 Karpatai
 Karsara
 Karsawan
 Karuna Baruna
 Kasauti
 Kasautia
 Kashi Tendua
 Kashri Bigaha
 Kasim Bigha
 Kasimpur
 Nishunpur 
 Kasman
 Kataia
 Kataria
 Katea
 Kathaha
 Kathautia
 Kathbar
 Kathri
 Kauakhap
 Kauriari
 Kawla
 Kazakpur
 Kazi Bigaha
 Kazichak
 Kera
 Kerap
 Kerka
 Kesaur
 Kesrarhi
 Ketaki
 Khaira
 Khaira Bandh
 Khaira Bind
 Khaira Firoz
 Khaira Jiwa Bigha
 Khaira Karamdih
 Khaira Majhauli
 Khaira Manorath
 Khaira Mohan
 Khaira Nonia Bigha
 Khaira Sarim
 Khairi
 Khairi Itwan
 Khairi Munrila
 Khairi Ram
 Khajuri
 Khajuri Panru
 Khajuri Tika
 Khakhra
 Khamdha
 Khambka
 Khan
 Khanda
 Khanria
 Khapar Manda
 Kharag Parsa
 Kharagpura
 Kharanti
 Kharauna Buzurg
 Kharauna Khurd
 Kharaundha
 Khardiha
 Khardiha Buzurg
 Kharjama
 Kharkani
 Kharokhar
 Kharwan
 Khasua
 Khathwara
 Khemda
 Khempur
 Khesar
 Khetpura
 Khirhiri
 Khiri Dayal
 Khiriawan
 Khoji
 Khori Khap
 Khudwan
 Khutaha
 Khutahan
 Kiakhap
 Kirpa Bigha
 Kishunpur
 Kochar
 Koilwan
 Koyal khap(Koilkhap)
 Kojhi
 Kolhua
 Kona
 Koni
 Koraipur
 Kothia
 Kotwara
 kulharia
 Kumhaini
 Kunar Bigha
 Kunda
 Kundifar
 Kunrwa
 Kurgain
 Kurka
 Kurmain
 Kurmha
 Kurwan
 Kusa
 Kusaha
 Kusarhi
 Kusdehra
 Kusdihra
 Kushdihra
 Kusi
 Kusiari
 Kusma Basdiha
 Kusmhi
 Kusmi
 Kutkuri
 Kutumba
 Kutumba Kanchanpur
 Labadna
 Labhri
 Labhri Khurd
 Lahar Chak
 Lahas
 Lahiarpur
 Lahsa
 Lakhaipur
 Lakhanpur
 Lakheya
 Lakhna
 Lakhui
 Lalaro
 Lalu Chak
 Lasra
 Lata
 Lauabar
 Lemo Khap
 Lerua
 Lobura
 Lodipur
 Lohanri
 Lohra
 Luka
 Machiar Bigaha
 Madanpur
 Madarpur
 Madarpura
 Maddupur
 Madhe
 Magurahi
 Mahaddi
 Maharajganj
 Mahawar
 Mahdewa
 Mahdi
 Mahdua
 Mahi
 Mahri
 Mahsi
 Mahsu
 Mahtha
 Mahthu
 Mahuain
 Mahuar
 Mahuari
 Mahuawan
 Mahulan
 Mahuli
 Mai
 Maigara
 Maikhurd
 Majathi
 Majhar
 Majhauli
 Majhgawan
 Majhiawan
 Majhiyawan
 Majkhar
 Majurahi
 Majurkha
 Makbulpurkhas
 Makhdumpur
 Makhra
 Malahad
 Malahra
 Malhara
 Mali
 Mallu Khaira
 Malpur
 Maluk Bigha
 Maluka Bigha
 Malwan
 Malwariya
 Mamka
 Manar
 Mangabar
 Mangi
 Manikpur
 Manka
 Manohari
 Manrar Gopal
 Mansara
 Manukhap
 Marar Sargara
 Marhi
 Maripur
 Marwatpur
 Masaundha
 Mastalichak
 Mathurapur
 Matihani
 Matpa
 Mauapur
 Mauari
 Maulanagar
 Maya Bigaha
 Mayapur
 Medan
 Meh
 Mehda
 Mehian
 Menghua
 Mian Bigha
 Mianpur
 Mirganj
 Mirpur
 Mirzapur
 Misir Bigha
 Misir Khap
 Misir Tendua
 Misra Bigha
 Mitarsenpur
 Mitraj
 Miyanpur
 Mobarakpur
 Moglahi
 Mohamadpur
 Mohammadpur
 Mohar Karman
 Mohiuddinpur
 Mohri Itwa
 Mokheta
 Mokhtarpur
 Morauli
 Motha
 Mujahar Mahamadpur
 Mujahida
 Mujrahra
 Mukhtarpur
 Munga
 Mungia
 Munjari
 Munrawa
 Munrila
 Muradpur
 Muraria
 Murarpur
 Murauli
 Murauli Khurd
 Musepurkhaira
 Nabinagar
 Nabinagar (NA)
 Nabinagar (NA) - Ward No.1
 Nabinagar (NA) - Ward No.2
 Nabinagar (NA) - Ward No.3
 Nabinagar (NA) - Ward No.4
 Nabinagar (NA) - Ward No.5
 Nabinagar (NA) - Ward No.6
 Nabinagar (NA) - Ward No.7
 Nabinagar (NA) - Ward No.8
 Nabinagar (NA) - Ward No.9
 Nadiain
 Nagain
 Naharkhap
 Nahro Dehri
 Naiki
 Nakain
 Narahi
 Naraich
 Narari Kalan
 Narari Khurd
 Naraula
 Narayan Khap
 Narayanpur
 Narayea Khap
 Narchahi
 Narchi
 Narhar Amba
 Narhi pirhi
 Narindra Khap
 Narkapi
 Narotanchak
 Narsan
 Narsiha
 Naudiha
 Naugarh
 Naur
 Nauranga
 Nawada
 Nawadih
 Neamatpur
 Neapur
 Nehuta
 Nehuti Lapura
 Neura
 Neura Deri
 Neura Surajmal
 Nima Anjan
 Nima Bazid
 Nima Mamrez
 Niman
 Niman Jodh
 Niman Kundraha
 Nimra
 Nirakhpur
 Niranjanpur
 Nirmal Bigha
 Nirpura
 Niyamatpur
 Nizampur
 Noawan
 Nonar
 Obra
 Or
 Ora
 Orani
 Ordih
 Oria Chak
 Pachar
 Pachariya
 Pachmo
 Pachmon
 Pachokhar
 Pachpokhari
 Pahaldih
 Paharman
 Paharpura
 Pahra
 Pakardih
 Pakari
 Pali
 Palkia
 Panararia
 Panchahra
 Panduki
 Panrariya
 Panre Karman
 Panre Khap
 Panrekarman
 Panrepur
 Panti
 Paranpur
 Paranpura
 Pararia
 Parariya
 Parasdih
 Parasi
 Parasia
 Parasiya Rampur
 Parihara
 Parrahi Salempur
 Parrawan
 Parsa
 Parsa ganesh
 Parsanwan
 Parsawan
 Parsawan Hathil
 Parsi
 Parta
 Partappur
 Paruki
 Paswa
 Patanwan
 Pataundhi
 Pateya
 Pathak Bigaha
 Pathak Bigha
 Patharkatti
 Pathra
 Pathraur
 Patila
 Patkhaul
 Patna
 Patoi
 Patoikhurd
 Pauthu
 Pawai
 Pawai Az Raqbe
 Pawaiya
 Pechkach
 Pema
 Peman
 Petarhi
 Phadarpur
 Phag
 Phesar
 Phesara
 Phesra
 Phuldiha
 Phulwaria
 Pichhuliya
 Pilchhi
 Pipardih
 Pipra
 Pipra Bagahi
 Piprahi
 Pipraura
 Pipri
 Piraunta
 Pirauta
 Pirtam Bigha
 Pirtampur
 Pirthu
 Piru
 Pirwan
 Pithanwan
 Poay
Pogar
 Poiwan
 Pokharaha
 Pokhraha
 Pokhrahi
 Poktha
 Pola
 Punabar
 Punaul
 Purahra
 Puranpur
 Qismat Karma
 Rabidas Khap
 Rafiganj
 Rafiganj (NA)
 Rafiganj (NA) - Ward No.1
 Rafiganj (NA) - Ward No.2
 Rafiganj (NA) - Ward No.3
 Rafiganj (NA) - Ward No.4
 Rafiganj (NA) - Ward No.5
 Rafiganj (NA) - Ward No.6
 Raghaulia
 Raghunathpur
 Rabhan Bigha
 Rahra
 Raja Kurka
 Rajapur
 Rajaura
 Rajoi
 Rajparsa
 Rajpur
 Rajwar
 Rajwaria
 Rajwaria Khurd
 Raksani
 Ramdiha
 Rampur(ubRampur)Aurangabad
 Ramnagar
 Rampur
 Rampur Khaira
 Rampur Naughara
 Rampur Parasiya
 Ranidih
 Rarhua
 Rasoia
 Rasulpur
 Ratan Khap
 Ratanpur
 Ratanpura
 Ratanuan
 Ratanwan
 Ratnaur
 Ratti Khap
 Ratwar
 Raypur Bandhwa
 Raypura
 Reganian Majhauli
 Rendia
 Renriya
 Repura
 Risiap
 Riur
 Rukhua
 Rukndi
 Rukunchak
 Runian
 Sabdal
 Sadikpur
 Sadipur
 Sadosaray
 Saduri
 Sagarpur
 Sahar
 Saharsa
 Sahaspur
 Sahdani
 Sahdei Parsawan
 Saheb Bigha
 Sahiari
 Sahokarman
 Saidpur
 Saidpur Naughara
 Sailopur
 Sailwa
 Saiyara
 Sakardih
 Sakarkhori
 Salaia
 Salaiya
 Salea
 Salempur
 Salhna
 Samahuta
 Sanaudha
 Sanhanpura
 Sanra
 Sanrhail
 Sanri
 Sansa
 Santhua
 Saraiwar
 Sarakar
 Saranga
 Saratu
 Sarawak
 Sardha Bigaha
 Sardiha
 Sardiha Kalan
 Sardiha Khurd
 Sareya
 Sarganwan
 Sarpata
 Sarsauli
 Sasna
 Satbahini
 Sattar
 Satuahi
 Saya
 Semariya
 Semmri Bechain
 Semra Jamsaid
 Semra Uchitbhan
 Semrahua
 Seno Khap
 Senuar
 Senuari
 Sewahi
 Shahmohamadpur
 Shahpur
 Shamshernagar
 Shankarpur
 Shekh pura
 Shekhpura
 Shivnathpur
 Shivpur
 Shiwa Sagar
 Shiwarajpur
 Shohda Keshopur, barun
 Sibanpur
 Sidha
 Sighna
 Sihari Kalan
 Sihuli
 Sihunri
 Sikaria
 Sikariya Ratan
 SikariyaManiyar
 Silar
 Silar Khurd
 Simla
 Simra
 Simra Dusadh
 Simra Kalan
 Simra Telpura
 Simrahua
 Simri
 Simri Bala
 Simri Dhamni
 Simribhed
 Simrigoti
 Simwan
 Sinduara
 Sinduriya
 Singhari
 Singhawan
 Singhi Buzurg
 Singhpur
 Sinuriya
 Sipah
 Siris
 Sirpal Chak
 Sisaul
 Sitaunja
 Siwan
 Sobhekhap
 Sohalpura
 Sohraiya
 Sokhea
 Sonar Khap
 Sonaura
 Sonbarsa
 Sonbarsa Khaira
 Sondih
 Sonhathu
 Sonahuli
 Soni
 Sonsagar
 Sori
 Sraur
 Suggi
 Suhai
 Suhi
 Suja Karman
 Sujan
 Sultan pur
 Sundarpur
 Surar
 Surhna
 Surju Khap
 Surkhi
 Surkhi Bigha
 Susna
 Susnar
 Takinagar
 Takra
 Tal
 Tamoli
 Tamsi
 Tankuppi
 Tanrwa
 Tanrwamansurpur
 Tara
 Tarar
 Tarari
 Teap
 Tejpura
 Teka Bigha
 Teldiha
 Telhara
 Telthua
 Temura
 Tendawa urf Tendua
 Tendua
 Tendua Harkes
 Tenduni
 Tengra
 Tenua
 Tenui Saraura
 Teri
 Tetar Chak
 Tetaria
 Tetrahanr
 Tetrahi
 Tetrain
 Thakurar
 Thanapur
 Tharaha
 Thawai
 Thengo
 Thumba
 Thumbhi
 Tikaura
 Tikri
 Tilakpura
 Tilauti
 Tol
 Toralpura
 Tuna
 Turkabara
 Turta
 Tuturukhi
 Ub
 Uchauli
 Uchkundha
 Uchkundhi
 Udaibhanchak
 Udaipura
 Ujaini
 Ukurmhi
 Umga
 Unthu
 Upahra
 Upardaha
 Urda
 Urdana
 Urdina
 Uriya
 Usurmha
 Usurmhi
 Wahid Bigha
 War Khas
 War Tola Bahrikhap
 War Tola Dharu Bigaha
 Wordiha
 Yadu Bigha
 Yari
 Zakaria
 Ziauddinpur

See also
 Aurangabad District, Bihar
 List of villages in Bihar

External links
 Villages in Aurangabad districtAdistrict